Eva Kolínská (Bohemia and Moravia, Germany, 24 July 1940 – 21 April 2020) was a Czechoslovak sprint canoer who competed in the early 1960s. She finished eighth in the K-2 500 m event at the 1960 Summer Olympics in Rome.

References

External links
 
 

1940 births
2020 deaths
Olympic canoeists of Czechoslovakia
Czechoslovak female canoeists
Canoeists at the 1960 Summer Olympics